Trick for Trick may refer to:

Plays
Trick for Trick (1678 play)
Trick for Trick (1735 play)

Films
Trick for Trick (film)